Tom Andersson (born 26 September 1984), known professionally as Waveshaper, is a Swedish electronic musician specialising in synthwave. Inspired by artists like Jean-Michel Jarre, Kraftwerk and Daft Punk, as well as 80s movie soundtracks, his music is retrofuturistic and is composed with a variety of hardware synthesizers, including the ARP 2600, Roland Jupiter-4, and Korg MS-20. He released his debut album Tracks To The Future on the label Lunar Boogie in 2013,  and the EP Sounds That Kill on Telefuture Records in 2014. In 2015, he released the four-track vinyl record Solar Drifter on the Swedish synthwave label Rad Rush Records.

Andersson also featured in the 2019 documentary film The Rise of the Synths which explored the origins and growth of the Synthwave genre, appearing alongside various other composers from the scene, including Carpenter Brut. John Carpenter also starred in and narrated the film.

Discography

Singles
 Dangerous Love (2013)
 So French Disco (2013)
 Modern Technology (2014, with Robert Parker)
 Chasing The Clone Of Myself (2014)
 Radio Signal (2014)
 My Faust - Death Race (Waveshaper Remix) (2015)
 Crystal Protocol (2015, NewRetroWave Records)
 66 MHz (2017)
 Walking in the Air (2020)

Albums
 Tracks To The Future (2013, Lunar Boogie)
 Retro Future (2014, Self Released)
 Sounds That Kill (2014, Telefuture Records)
 Solar Drifter (2015, Rad Rush Records)
 Exploration 84 (2015, Self Released)
 Station Nova (2016, NewRetroWave Records)
 Velocity (2017)
 Lost Shapes (2018)
 Lost Shapes Reinvented (2018)
 Artifact (2019)
 Mainframe (2021)
 Forgotten Shapes (2022)

Other 
 Part of the soundtrack for Furi
 Remixed the song "Eden" for the 2016 synthwave album Scandroid

References

Swedish electronic musicians
Synthwave musicians